Tomás Mulligan (14 August 1977 – 27 August 2007) is a former Gaelic footballer who played at senior level for the Dublin county team. Mulligan played club football for Good Counsel, Ballinteer St Johns and Round towers. He also attended Drimnagh Castle primary and secondary schools, where he made the first of his Croke Park appearances.

References

1977 births
2007 deaths
Dublin inter-county Gaelic footballers
Good Counsel Gaelic footballers
Round Towers Clondalkin Gaelic footballers